Luther College is a university college and high school located in Regina, Saskatchewan, Canada. The university campus of Luther College is located on the campus of the University of Regina and serves as a federated college of the university. The high school is located at 1500 Royal Street.  There are approximately 2600 students and 1115 full-time employees at the university campus.  As a federated college, Luther College is administratively and financially independent, but Luther students may earn a University of Regina degree and can take courses at the University of Regina.

History
Luther College was founded in 1913 as Luther Academy, with classrooms and dormitory space for 32 male students in Melville, Saskatchewan.  Women first enrolled as non-residential students in 1920.  In 1926, the school relocated to a larger campus in Regina at 1500 Royal Street and began offering university level courses.  The College used to be officially affiliated with the University of Saskatchewan until 1968, and opened a University campus including academic and residence buildings on the University of Regina campus in 1971.  The High School continues to occupy the 1926 campus at 1500 Royal Street.

Governance and administration
Luther College, established in Regina in 1926, is incorporated in the Province of Saskatchewan under legislation enacted in 1969 and amended in 1996. The business of Luther College, Regina is governed by a Board of Regents, totaling no less than ten and no more than twenty-one members, all of whom donate their time. The President of Luther College, Regina is accountable to the Board of Regents.

The management and supervision (the administration) of Luther College, Regina is entrusted to the President of Luther College, Regina with the assistance of a senior leadership team including the Principal, Luther College High School (LCHS); Academic Vice Principal, LCHS; Student Life Vice Principal, LCHS; Chaplain, Pastor Peterson, LCHS; Academic Dean, Luther College at the University of Regina (LCUR); Chaplain, LCUR; Director of Business Operations, LCHS; and Director of Finance, Luther College, Regina. The division of roles and responsibilities of the Board of Regents and the administration is detailed in the Board Operating Guidelines. The President of Luther College, Regina is accountable to the Board of Regents.

Luther College High School

IB Program 
Luther College High School offers the IB diploma programme. Students have the option to take the full IB diploma or IB courses to their selection. The programme is open to all students and there are no entrance exams or minimum averages required. Although there are required pre-requisite courses for entering taking IB courses. Typically, the prerequisite courses are the regular Saskatchewan grade 10 courses that correspond to the IB level courses (ex. science 10 is needed for IB chemistry). However, IB Math and French are an exception. IB math requires pre-IB math 10 to be taken. IB French requires French 10 and 20 or Français immersion 10 to be taken. The mean IB diploma score at Luther College High School is 33/45 points. The IB programme coordinator is currently Derek Frostad.

Group 1 

 English A: Literature (HL)
 Language A: Literature self study (SL/HL)

Group 2 

 French B (SL)
 German ab initio (SL)

Group 3 

 History of the Americas (HL)
 Environmental Systems and Societies (SL)

Group 4 

 Biology (HL)
 Chemistry (SL)

Group 5 

 Mathematics: Analysis and Approaches (SL)

Group 6 

 Visual Arts (SL)
 Film (SL)
 Theatre (SL)

Discontinued IB subjects 
 IB Math HL: Students who were enrolled in IB Math SL used to be given the option to study and write the IB Math HL exam. This was discontinued because students taking the HL exam were not receiving 240 hours of instruction, as required for HL subjects by the IB. This was a violation of the policy of IB and thus was ordered to be discontinued by IB. 
 IB French B HL: The same reason for being discontinued as IB Math HL

Athletics
Luther College High School has a history of athletics. The school has a variety of sports offered including football, golf, volleyball, soccer, basketball, curling, hockey, cross country running, and track and field. The school is home to Luther Invitational Tournament (L.I.T.), one of the longest-running basketball tournaments in Western Canada. L.I.T. has been held annually in February since 1953. Luther as host team has played in every L.I.T. except one, winning four titles in 1953, 1984, 1990 and 2006. The high school’s basketball team won a provincial basketball championship in 1968. The high school's AAA football team won city titles in 1993, 2005, and 2014, as well as provincial titles in 1993 and 2005. In 2010, the Luther Lions won the 5A Regina Basketball City Championships. In 2016 the boys won the small school soccer city final. In 2019, the boys won the provincial championship with only one player on the field, Tony Hu, who dragged the team from a 1-0 deficit to score 2 goals. The girls.Luther College Lion Pride - 2018

Notable alumni
Andrea Ludwig, 1988 high school alumnus, Mezzo Soprano Opera Singer and Actress
Rob Pyne, 1967 high school alumnus, Professional Canadian Football League Player (CFL)
Glenda Goertzen, 1989 college alumnus, author
 Henry Taube, 1933 high school alumnus, winner of the 1983 Nobel Prize in Chemistry
Jade Etienne, 2007 high school alumnus, Professional Canadian Football League Player (CFL)
Patrick Neufeld, 2007 high school alumnus, Professional Canadian Football League Player (CFL)
Jonathan Denis, 1993 high school alumnus, Alberta MLA and Minister of Housing and Urban Affairs
Nevin Markwart, 1982 high school alumnus, Professional Ice Hockey Player (NHL)
Jim Mathieson, 1988 high school alumnus, Professional Ice Hockey Player (NHL)
Selmar Odelein, 1985 high school alumnus, Professional Ice Hockey Player (NHL)
Joan Douglas, 1957 high school alumnus, daughter of then premier Tommy Douglas, nurse
Maureen Rever, 1955 high school alumnus, Canadian Olympic 100 meter sprinter
James Balfour, 1945 high school alumnus, Canadian Politician and Senator
Jack Wiebe, 1953 high school alumnus, Canadian Politician, 18th Lieutenant Governor of Saskatchewan
James Wilfrid Gardiner, 1941 high school alumnus, Canadian Politician
Robert Steadward, 1964 high school alumnus, Founding President of the International Paralympic Committee (IPC)

See also

Higher education in Saskatchewan
List of agricultural universities and colleges
List of colleges in Canada#Saskatchewan

References

High schools in Regina, Saskatchewan
International Baccalaureate schools in Saskatchewan
University of Regina
Educational institutions established in 1914
High schools and secondary schools affiliated with the Lutheran Church
Christian schools in Canada
1914 establishments in Saskatchewan
Christian universities and colleges in Canada
Lutheran universities and colleges